The 2012 Campeonato Potiguar is the 92nd season of Rio Grande do Norte's top professional football league. The competition began on 15 January and ended on 6 May. ABC was the defending champion.

Format

Participating teams

First stage (Taça Cidade de Natal)

Semifinals

Finals

First leg

Second leg

ABC won 2-0 on aggregate. ABC first stage champions

Second stage (Copa Rio Grande do Norte)

Semifinals

Finals

First leg

Second leg

América won 6-1 on aggregate. América second stage champions

Championship finals

First leg

Second leg 

America won 4-1 on aggregate. state champions 2012

References

Rn